Nettie may refer to:

Literature
The Nettie Palmer Prize for Non-fiction, an Australian literary award offered for a published work of non-fiction and a component of the annual Victorian Premier's Literary Award

Medicine
 Nettie pot, also neti pot, a device used for nasal irrigation

Music
"Nettie", a song by Type O Negative's on the album Life Is Killing Me
"Nettie Moore", a song on the album Modern Times (Bob Dylan album)

People
Nettie (name)

Places
Nettie, West Virginia, an unincorporated community in Nicholas County, West Virginia, in the United States
Lake Nettie National Wildlife Refuge in North Dakota in the United States

Ships
USS Nettie (SP-1436), a United States Navy patrol boat in commission from 1917 to 1918

See also
Neti (disambiguation)
Netti (disambiguation)
Netty (disambiguation)